Kimberley Mickle (born 28 December 1984) is an Australian track and field athlete who competes in the javelin throw. Her personal best of 66.83 m, achieved on 22 March 2014 in Melbourne, was, until 2018, the Australian record.

Biography
She won the gold medal at the 2001 World Youth Championships, finished ninth at the 2002 World Junior Championships, fourth at the 2006 Commonwealth Games, fifth at the 2006 IAAF World Cup and sixth at the 2009 World Athletics Final. She also competed at the 2009 World Championships without reaching the final.

Mickle took the silver medal at the 2013 World Championships in Athletics reaching a result of 66.60 m (PB) behind Christina Obergföll.

In 2014, she won the gold medal at the Commonwealth games with a throw of 65.96 meters.

At the 2016 Summer Olympics, Mickle failed to advance to the final after dislocating her shoulder during the qualifying round.

In September 2016, Mickle signed to play professional Australian rules football for the Fremantle Football Club in the inaugural season of AFL Women's in 2017. She previously played the sport at a junior level. After missing the first round of the 2017 AFL Women's season due to a hip injury, Mickle ruptured an anterior cruciate ligament in round 2. After knee reconstruction, Mickle announced that she would concentrate on javelin in preparation for the 2018 Commonwealth Games, and would not return to football.

Achievements

References

External links

1984 births
Athletes (track and field) at the 2006 Commonwealth Games
Athletes (track and field) at the 2010 Commonwealth Games
Athletes (track and field) at the 2012 Summer Olympics
Athletes (track and field) at the 2016 Summer Olympics
Athletes (track and field) at the 2014 Commonwealth Games
World Athletics Championships athletes for Australia
Australian female javelin throwers
Olympic female javelin throwers
Commonwealth Games gold medallists for Australia
Living people
Olympic athletes of Australia
Athletes from Perth, Western Australia
Sportswomen from Western Australia
World Athletics Championships medalists
Commonwealth Games silver medallists for Australia
Commonwealth Games medallists in athletics
Fremantle Football Club (AFLW) players
Australian rules footballers from Western Australia
20th-century Australian women
21st-century Australian women
Medallists at the 2014 Commonwealth Games